Virgin Orbit is a company within the Virgin Group which provides launch services for small satellites. On January 17, 2021, their LauncherOne rocket successfully reached orbit for the first time, and successfully deployed 10 cubesats. In mid-March 2023, the company furloughed nearly all its employees and paused operations while it looked for funding.

The company was formed in 2017 to develop the air-launched LauncherOne rocket, launched from a modified Boeing 747 aircraft named Cosmic Girl; this tandem had previously been a project of Virgin Galactic.

On 30 December 2021 Virgin Orbit underwent a SPAC merger with NextGen Acquisition Corp, and became a publicly traded company (symbol VORB) at the NASDAQ stock exchange. At the SPAC merger Virgin Orbit was valued at $3.7 billion in equity.

On 10 January 2023, the company confirmed that their first rocket launched from the United Kingdom had experienced an 'anomaly' and had failed to reach its planned orbit.

Vehicles

LauncherOne

On May 25, 2020, LauncherOne's first launch failed to reach orbit.

On January 17, 2021, LauncherOne became the first Virgin Orbit vehicle to reach orbit, successfully deploying 10 CubeSats into Low Earth Orbit for NASA on its final demonstration mission. LauncherOne was deployed from the left (port) wing of a retrofitted Boeing 747, 33,000 feet (10 kilometers) above the Pacific Ocean. The rocket was dedicated to the memory of Eve Branson, mother of Richard Branson, founder of Virgin, who died from COVID-19 on the 8th of January 2021.

On June 30, 2021, LauncherOne successfully delivered its first commercial payload to space.

On January 13, 2022, LauncherOne successfully delivered seven cubesats for three customers into orbit.

On 2 July 2022 LauncherOne flew a successful mission.

On 9 January 2023 LauncherOne failed to orbit despite a nominal drop from the aircraft, with Virgin Orbit citing "an anomaly" with the upper stage. The failed payload included nine satellites from seven different customers. This was Virgin Orbit's first attempted launch from the UK at Spaceport Cornwall; previous launches were from Mojave Air and Space Port.

Cosmic Girl
Cosmic Girl is the name of the modified Boeing 747-400 that Virgin Orbit uses to launch its rockets. In 2022, Virgin Orbit announced plans to acquire additional 747s with the ability to transport the rocket and ground support equipment internally.

Operations and financials 
Based in Long Beach, California, at its founding in 2017, Virgin Orbit has more than 300 employees led by president Dan Hart, a former vice president of government satellite systems at Boeing. The company from which it was spun off, Virgin Galactic, continued to focus on two other capabilities: human suborbital spaceflight operations and advanced aerospace design, manufacturing, and testing.

A few months prior to going public, Virgin Orbit was owned by Richard Branson's Virgin Group and the Emirati state-owned Mubadala, which had invested about $1 billion in Virgin Orbit through August 2021.

In August 2021 when the SPAC merger was announced, Virgin Orbit estimated it needed $420 million in cash, starting in the second half of 2021, to reach positive cash flow in 2024.  When it went public in December 2021, after completing its SPAC merger, the company raised $228 million, less than half than the $483 million it expected to raise. Virgin Orbit held an “opening bell” ceremony at Nasdaq January 7, 2022 to celebrate going public; it opened at $10 per share.

When the SPAC merger was announced in August 2021, Virgin Orbit aimed to be profitable on an EBITDA-basis by 2024. The company said it had about $300 million in active contracts, and expected its rocket launch business to grow to about 18 launches in 2023. The company expected to have about $15 million in revenue in 2021, with an EBITDA loss of $156 million; however, it aimed at further revenue growth, reaching $2.1 billion in revenue by 2026.

The company's third-quarter financial report, issued in November 2022, showed cash on hand of $71.2 million, $30.9 million in revenue, and an adjusted EBITDA loss of $42.9 million for the period. The company's backlog of binding contracts fell by 12%, to $143 million, compared to the end of the prior quarter, and forecast that it would only have three launches in 2022, compared to a forecast of four to six, made earlier in 2022.

On March 16, 2023, Virgin Orbit announced a pausing of operations and furloughing of nearly its entire staff, while seeking additional funding. Causes for the event are cited as both capital management and technical. Virgin Orbit recorded a loss of US$139.5 million for the first nine months of 2022, while a launch failure on Jan 9 2023 resulted in the total loss of payload. The Matthew Brown Companies, an investor in SpaceX, has indicated a potential sale, though Brown denies a hostile takeover.

VOX Space 
VOX Space is a subsidiary of Virgin Orbit that was created in 2020. The company supplies launch services for the US military, sometimes referred to as the "national security launch market." The company uses the Virgin Orbit LauncherOne launch vehicle. The current president as of July 2022 is Mark Baird, who took over on 17 August 2021.

In April 2020, VOX Space was awarded a  contract for three launches of 44 cubesats for US Space Force. The first of these launches succeeded on 2 July 2022.

Other projects

Ventilators 

In response to the COVID-19 pandemic in early 2020, Virgin Orbit announced it was a partner with the University of California Irvine and the University of Texas at Austin in a new venture to build simplified mechanical ventilators  — specifically "bridge ventilators" for partially recovered patients and patients not in intensive care — to address the critical global shortage of ventilators. They were granted an emergency use authorization by the US Food and Drug Administration (FDA) in April 2020.

Launch site in the UK

Virgin Orbit agreed to launch space flights from Spaceport Cornwall in a project partly funded by the UK Space Agency.

Virgin Orbit's first UK launch took place on 9 January 2023. The rocket was deployed successfully, but suffered an "anomaly" and failed to reach orbit.

Launch site in Brazil
In April 2021, the Brazilian Space Agency disclosed the company among those selected to operate orbital launches from the Alcantara Launch Center in Brazil. On 27 June 2022, Virgin Orbit announced a Brazil-based subsidiary, Virgin Orbit Brasil Ltda, which will facilitate launches from the Alcantara Launch Center.  The Brazil based launch center is just 2 degrees south of the Equator, allowing launches to almost every orbital inclination.

Launch site in Australia
In September 2022, Virgin Orbit signed an agreement with Wagner Corporation to base a 747-400 launch aircraft at Toowoomba Wellcamp Airport in Queensland with a demonstrator launch planned for 2024.

Personnel
In October 2019, Virgin Orbit announced that Matthew Stannard was joining as a pilot on a three-year contract. Stannard had previously served in the Royal Air Force as a test and evaluation pilot notably on Typhoon jets. At that time Orbit was about to start testing its Cosmic Girl launch platform.

References

External links
 

 
Aerospace companies of the United States
Private spaceflight companies
Commercial launch service providers
Virgin Galactic
Technology companies based in Greater Los Angeles
Companies based in Long Beach, California
Technology companies established in 2017
American companies established in 2017
2017 establishments in California
Aabar Investments